William Jones (29 September 1928 – 16 August 2017) was a Canadian sports shooter. He competed in the trap event at the 1960 Summer Olympics.

References

External links
 

1928 births
2017 deaths
Canadian male sport shooters
Olympic shooters of Canada
Shooters at the 1960 Summer Olympics
Place of birth missing